The English ceremonial county of West Yorkshire is divided into 22 parliamentary constituencies: 12 borough constituencies and 10 county constituencies.

Constituencies

2010 boundary changes 
Under the Fifth Periodic Review of Westminster constituencies, the Boundary Commission for England decided to reduce the number of seats in West Yorkshire from 23 to 22, leading to significant changes in the Cities of Leeds and Wakefield, with the abolition of Elmet, Morley and Rothwell, Normanton, and Pontefract and Castleford and the creation of Elmet and Rothwell, Morley and Outwood, and Normanton, Pontefract and Castleford. Bradford North was renamed Bradford East.

Former boundaries

Current boundaries

Proposed boundary changes 
See 2023 Periodic Review of Westminster constituencies for further details.

Following the abandonment of the Sixth Periodic Review (the 2018 review), the Boundary Commission for England formally launched the 2023 Review on 5 January 2021. Initial proposals were published on 8 June 2021 and, following two periods of public consultation, revised proposals were published on 8 November 2022. Final proposals will be published by 1 July 2023.

The commission has proposed that West Yorkshire be combined with North Yorkshire as a sub-region of the Yorkshire and the Humber Region, resulting in the creation of two new cross-county boundary constituencies: Selby which comprises the majority of North Yorkshire district of Selby and includes the City of Leeds ward of Kippax and Methley; and a new constituency named Wetherby and Easingwold which includes the City of Leeds wards of Harewood and Weatherby. As a consequence, the following changes are proposed: Elmet and Rothwell is abolished; Wakefield is reconfigured and now includes the towns of Rothwell and Outwood; Morley and Outwood becomes Morley; a new constituency named Wakefield West and Denby Dale is created; and the town of Normanton is transferred from Normanton, Pontefract and Castleford to Hemsworth, leading to the re-establishment of Pontefract and Castleford and the new constituency of Normanton and Hemsworth. Elsewhere, Batley and Spen, and Dewsbury are realigned to form Dewsbury and Batley, and Spen Valley, and Leeds West is abolished, offset by the creation of Headingley. Although its boundaries are unchanged, it is proposed that Keighley is renamed Keighley and Ilkley.

The following constituencies are proposed:

Covering electoral wards within Bradford
Bradford East
Bradford South
Bradford West
Keighley and Ilkley
Shipley CC
Covering electoral wards within Calderdale
Calder Valley
Halifax
Covering electoral wards within Kirklees
Colne Valley
Dewsbury and Batley
Huddersfield
Wakefield West and Denby Dale (part)
Covering electoral wards within Leeds
Headingley
Leeds Central
Leeds East
Leeds North East
Leeds North West
Morley
Pudsey
Selby (also contains part of the North Yorkshire district of Selby)
Wakefield (part)
Wetherby and Easingwold (also contains parts of the North Yorkshire borough of Harrogate and districts of Hambleton and Selby)
Covering electoral wards within Wakefield
Normanton and Hemsworth
Wakefield West and Denby Dale (part)
Pontefract and Castleford
Wakefield (part)

Results history
Primary data source: House of Commons research briefing - General election results from 1918 to 2019

2019 
The number of votes cast for each political party who fielded candidates in constituencies comprising West Yorkshire in the 2019 general election were as follows:

Percentage votes 

11983 & 1987 - SDP-Liberal Alliance

* Included in Other

Seats 

11983 & 1987 - SDP-Liberal Alliance

Maps 

Maps before 1983 show the traditional boundaries of the West Riding of Yorkshire

Historical representation by party
Data given is for the West Riding of Yorkshire before 1983. A cell marked → (with a different colour background to the preceding cell) indicates that the previous MP continued to sit under a new party name.

1885 to 1918

Areas currently in North Yorkshire

Areas currently in West Yorkshire

Areas currently in South Yorkshire

1918 to 1950

1950 to 1983

1983 to present

See also
 List of parliamentary constituencies in Yorkshire and the Humber

Notes

References

External links
 Boundary Commission for England: West Yorkshire Boroughs

Yorkshire, West
 
Politics of West Yorkshire
Parliamentary constituencies